Cho In-chol (born 2 October 1973) is a North Korean former footballer. He represented North Korea on at least seventeen occasions between 1990 and 1993, scoring twice. He also represented the unified Korean team at the 1991 FIFA World Youth Championship.

Managerial career
Cho was named manager of the North Korea national football team in 2010.

Career statistics

International

International goals
Scores and results list North Korea's goal tally first, score column indicates score after each North Korea goal.

References

1972 births
Living people
North Korean footballers
North Korean football managers
North Korea national football team managers
North Korea international footballers
Association football defenders
Pyongyang Sports Club players